Raidió Fáilte  (meaning "Welcome Radio") is an Irish-language community radio station, broadcasting from Belfast, in Northern Ireland. It started broadcasting under its current licence on 15 September 2006 having operated as a pirate radio station for some time prior to that.

The station can be heard on 107.1 FM in the Belfast area, and online through a live stream on the station's website. It is broadcast 24 hours a day, seven days a week and was broadcast from the cultural centre Cultúrlann McAdam Ó Fiaich on the Falls Road for several years and subsequently from The Twin Spires Centre on Northumberland Street off the Falls Road, Belfast. In October 2018 the station moved to a state-of-the-art new building on the junction of the Falls Road and the Westlink motorway.

History 
Raidió Fáilte began airing on a part-time basis from Cultúrlann McAdam Ó Fiaich in the 1990s.

Raidió Fáilte was re-launched in Belfast City Hall on 15 September 2006 when Station Manager Fergus Ó hÍr introduced guest speakers Ferdia Mac an Fhailigh, Chief Executive of Foras na Gaeilge, and Bob Collins, Commissioner of the Equality Commission. A recorded message from the President of Ireland Mary McAleese welcoming the launch of Raidió Fáilte was played at the start of broadcasting.

Programming 
Programmes are aimed at the Irish-speaking community in Belfast. A mixture of traditional Irish music, indie, rock and world music and  can be heard, together with current affairs and sports coverage and chat. Special programmes relating to Roman Catholic and Presbyterian church services through the medium of Irish have also been broadcast.

See also 
Raidió na Life - Irish language community radio station in Dublin
List of Irish-language media
List of Celtic-language media

References

External links 
Official website

Former pirate radio stations
Radio stations in Northern Ireland
Community radio stations in Ireland
Mass media in Belfast
Radio stations established in 2006
Irish-language radio stations
2006 establishments in Northern Ireland